Hans Hierzer (born 9 May 1955) is an Austrian sports shooter. He competed in two events at the 1988 Summer Olympics.

References

1955 births
Living people
Austrian male sport shooters
Olympic shooters of Austria
Shooters at the 1988 Summer Olympics
People from Weiz District
Sportspeople from Styria
20th-century Austrian people